Lough Hyne is a fully  marine sea lough in West Cork, Ireland, about 5 km southwest of Skibbereen. It was designated as Ireland's first Marine Nature Reserve in 1981.

Features 
Lough Hyne was probably a freshwater lake until about four millennia ago (2000 BC, during the Atlantic Bronze Age), when rising sea levels flooded it with saline ocean water. The lake is now fed by tidal currents that rush in from the Atlantic through Barloge Creek. The stretch between the creek and the lake is known as "The Rapids." The lake's small size, only 0.8 km by 0.6 km, creates an unusual habitat of highly oxygenated yet warm seawater that sustains an enormous variety of plants and animals, many of which are not found anywhere else in Ireland. A wide variety of environments such as cliffs, salt marsh, beach, and areas of greatly varying water movement add to the area's biodiversity. Some of the seawalls around the lake and the Rapids were built as relief work during the Great Hunger.

Scientific investigation of the area began in 1886 when Rev. William Spottswood Green first recorded the presence of the purple sea urchin Paracentrotus lividus. Prof. Louis Renouf resumed the scientific work in 1923 and promoted it as a 'biological station' and sustained studies have been carried out there since then. It is now one of the most-studied sites of its size in the world. Several laboratories were constructed near the shores of the lake, supporting ground-breaking ecological research under Prof. Jack Kitching and Dr John Ebling. An illustrated history of the marine research was published in 2011 'Lough Hyne: The Marine Researchers - in Pictures'.

The area is a tourist attraction with a permanent exhibition on the lough and its importance at nearby Skibbereen Heritage Centre. The ruins of Saint Bridgit's Church are on the shores of the lake, as well as holy wells, Tobarín Súl and Skour Well, on the side of Knockomagh Hill. Castle Island is located in the center of the lake where the ruins of Cloghan Castle, once a fortress of the O'Driscoll clan, are still visible. A nature trail up Knockomagh Hill offers superb views of the lough and the surrounding area. Lough Hyne is a kayaking and swimming destination for locals and tourists in the summer.

See also
List of loughs in Ireland

References

Sources
The Skibbereen Heritage Center
The history of scientific research at Lough Hyne
Tourist information
The establishment of Lough Hyne as a Marine Reserve, including a map of the Reserve
Underwater video from Lough Hyne

Further reading
Kearney, T. 2013. Lough Hyne – from Prehistory to the Present published by Macalla Publishing in 2013. 
Kearney, T. 2011. Lough Hyne: The Marine Researchers – in Pictures published by Skibbereen Heritage Centre in 2011. 
Norton, T.A. 2001. And in the beginning... the Pioneering Ecological work at Lough Hyne. in Marine Biodiversity in Ireland and Adjacent Waters. Proceedings of a Conference 26–27 April 2001. Ulster Museum publication no. 8.
Norton, T.A. 2002.Reflections on a summer sea published by Century (Random House Group), London. 
Holmes, J.M.C. 2008. Crustacean records from Lough Hyne (Ine), Co. Cork, Ireland: Part VIII. Bull. Ir. Biogeogr. Soc. No. 32: 62 – 68.

Hyne
Marine reserves of the Republic of Ireland
Nature reserves in the Republic of Ireland
Marine sanctuaries
Protected areas of County Cork
Landforms of County Cork